Scheibler is a surname. Notable people with the surname include:
Scheibler (mountain), in the Verwall Alps in Tyrol, Austria
Carl Scheibler (1827–1899), German sugar chemist
Christoph Scheibler (1589–1653), philosopher, author Opus Metaphysicum
Frederick G. Scheibler, Jr. (1872–1958), American architect
Johann Scheibler (1777–1837), silk manufacturer of Crefeld, and contributor to the science of acoustics
Karl Wilhelm Scheibler (1820–1881), German-Polish industrialist

See also
Karl Scheibler's Chapel, major architectural work in Łódź, Poland